Slobodan Karalić (14 May 1956 – 26 November 2013) was a Yugoslav association footballer.

Club career
Karalić played for Borac Banja Luka in the Yugoslav First League. While playing for this club, in 1988, he won Yugoslav Cup. He was also a member of FK Crvena Zvezda in 1983/84 season, but he did not play in any league match.

Coaching career
After retiring he had a coaching career in Greece, Cyprus and Bosnia and Herzegovina.

Death
After a long and serious illness, Slobodan Karalić died, 26 November 2013.

References

External links
Interview at FK Borac Banja Luka oficial website
Greek League 1985 at RSSSF

1956 births
2013 deaths
Sportspeople from Banja Luka
Serbs of Bosnia and Herzegovina
Association football goalkeepers
Yugoslav footballers
FK Borac Banja Luka players
Red Star Belgrade footballers
Ethnikos Piraeus F.C. players
Yugoslav First League players
Super League Greece players
Yugoslav expatriate footballers
Expatriate footballers in Greece
Yugoslav expatriate sportspeople in Greece
Bosnia and Herzegovina football managers
AEP Paphos FC managers
Nea Salamis Famagusta FC managers
FK Borac Banja Luka managers
Premier League of Bosnia and Herzegovina managers
Bosnia and Herzegovina expatriate footballers
Expatriate football managers in Greece
Bosnia and Herzegovina expatriate sportspeople in Greece
Expatriate football managers in Cyprus
Bosnia and Herzegovina expatriate sportspeople in Cyprus